Patanotis is a genus of moths in the family Momphidae.  The species of this genus are found in Sri Lanka.

Species
Patanotis harmosta  Meyrick, 1913
Patanotis metallidias  Meyrick, 1913

References

ftp.funet.fr

Momphidae
Moths of Sri Lanka